Migraine treatment may be either prophylactic (preventive) or abortive (rescue). Prevention is better than cure, so the ideal treatment goal is to prevent migraine attacks. Because migraine is an exceedingly complex condition, there are various preventive treatments which have their effect by disrupting different links in the chain of events that occur during a migraine attack. As rescue treatments also target and disrupt different processes occurring during migraine, these are summarized, with their relative merits and demerits.

Preventive treatment

Preventive treatments can be sub-divided into non-drug treatments, and treatment with medication. Non-drug treatment, when possible, is preferable because of the high incidence of unpleasant or debilitating side-effects that occur with migraine preventive drugs.

Non–medication-based
Because of the complexity of migraine, no preventive treatment modality is effective for all migraine sufferers.
However in FDA trials the Nociceptive Trigeminal Inhibition Tension Suppression System (NTI-tss) had been proven to provide a
77% reduction of migraine events in 82% of subjects tested. Practical Neurology Oct. 2005 The origin of the pain must be determined in each individual, and each contributory factor must be addressed. Most migraine sufferers have a combination of two or more of the following: a) vascular pain (pain originating in the arteries of the scalp), b) muscular pain (pain originating from the jaw and neck muscles), c) pain or abnormal sensitivity of the skin of the scalp (known as cutaneous allodynia), and hypersensitivity of the brain to incoming pain messages
Another commonly employed, non-medication based technique for treating migraines is suboccipital inhibition. Suboccipital inhibition is an osteopathic medical manipulation in which the practitioner applies continuous pressure onto the subocciptal muscles in order to stimulate relief.

Surgery

Chronic daily headache is a major worldwide health problem that affects 3–5% of the population and results in substantial disability. Advances in the medical management of headache disorders have meant that a substantial proportion of patients can be effectively treated with medical treatments. However, a significant proportion of these patients are intractable to drug treatment. The successful use of surgical procedures for the treatment of migraine is becoming more frequently reported in the medical literature, particularly for those patients who do not respond to medication. There is resistance in some quarters the concept of surgery for migraine, on the grounds that it is unnecessarily invasive. On the contrary, others argue that to undergo a relatively minor and minimally invasive once-off surgical procedure is not as invasive as having to permanently take chronic medication, which in many people has unpleasant or intolerable side effects, or is ineffective. The answer to this conundrum lies however in informed consent - the patient must be advised of all the possibilities, and of all the pros and cons of each option, so that an informed choice can be made. In some instances, patients opt for the drug route, and only take the surgical option when the medication has not had the desired effect. For others, the thought of being on chronic medication is anathema.

Arterial pain
In many migraine sufferers the pain originates in painfully dilated extracranial terminal branches of the external carotid artery. That vasodilatation is an important factor in migraine is further confirmed by the fact that the most widely used migraine rescue medications, the ergots, the triptans, and the promising newer drugs, the gepants, possess one significant common denominator: they all potently constrict abnormally dilated extracranial arteries while simultaneously reducing or eliminating migraine pain. Furthermore, to date all migraine-provoking agents have had vasodilating properties.

Arterial surgery
In patients where the pain has been positively diagnosed to originate from the scalp arteries (the terminal branches of the external carotid artery), the preventive treatment of choice is surgical cauterization of the responsible arteries – known as the Shevel Procedure.

Details of the Procedure

In order to pinpoint the position of the relevant arteries, a three-dimensional CT scan is done, which allows accurate visualization of the course of each artery. This is necessary, as the course of the arteries varies from person to person, and even from side to side in the same individual. During surgery, the position of the artery is further verified by means of a Doppler Flowmeter, with which one can hear the blood flowing through the vessel. Use of the three-dimensional CT scan and the Doppler Flowmeter allows the surgeon to make use of the smallest possible incision, so the procedure is minimally invasive. The most common vessels involved in the pain of migraine are the terminal branches of the external carotid artery, and in particular, the superficial temporal artery and its frontal branch, and the occipital artery, but the maxillary, posterior auricular, supra-orbital, and supra-trochlear branches may also be involved. These vessels are subcutaneous (just under the skin) and the small incisions required to access them and the minimally invasive nature of the procedure means that the surgery can be done in a day facility. As these vessels have no connection with the arterial supply to the brain, the Shevel Procedure is exceedingly safe with no unpleasant side effects. The cosmetic effect is excellent as most of the incisions are within the hairline.

When is arterial surgery indicated?

Arterial surgery is only indicated once there is positive confirmation that the arteries are indeed the source of pain. Some migraine sufferers have a visibly distended artery on the temple during an attack, which confirms that the arteries are involved. The distention usually subsides as the pain is controlled by vasoconstrictor drugs (ergots or triptans). In some, this artery is always visible, but it is only when it becomes distended during an attack that it becomes important for diagnosis. Patients who take triptans or ergots for relief of migraine pain are also prime candidates for arterial surgery. The reason for this is that the action of these drugs is to constrict the painfully dilated branches of the external carotid artery - the same arteries that are targeted by the surgery. The purpose of the surgery is to provide a permanent 'triptan or ergot effect'. Most of these arteries are in the scalp and are readily accessible to minimally invasive surgery. This treatment modality is of particular value in: 1) patients who have not responded to preventive drug therapy, 2) patients who are unable to use drug therapy because they experience unacceptable side effects, 3) patients who have to make too frequent use of abortive drugs such as the triptans or ergots, and 4) patients who would prefer not to be on permanent medication. Included in this category are those with Chronic Daily Headache (headache on more than 15 days per month) and patients with what is known as "refractory headache" - headache that has not benefited from any other form of treatment. Elliot Shevel, a South African surgeon, showed that patients with chronic migraine experienced a significant reduction in pain levels and significant improvement in their quality of life following the surgery.

Muscle surgery - trigger site release
Trigger site release was first described by a plastic surgeon, Dr Bahaman Guyuron. The theory is that trigger sites (TSs) exist where sensory nerves are being compressed by a surrounding muscle. The nerve becomes inflamed, and a cascade of events is initiated, triggering migraine headaches. Thus far, three muscle trigger areas where the nerve passes through a muscle have been identified as surgical candidates – where the a) greater occipital nerve pierces through the semispinalis capitis muscle, b) the zygomaticotemporal nerve passes through the temporalis muscle, and c) the supraorbital/supratrochlear nerves pass through the glabellar muscle group (the corrugator supercilii, depressor supercilii, and procerus muscles). Several large series of studies have been conducted to evaluate the efficacy of surgical obliteration of trigger points. Almost all demonstrated more than 90% response in a carefully selected group of patients who have a positive response to Botox therapy, with at least 50% improvement to complete resolution of migraine pain.

Details of the procedures
Patients have to be screened preoperatively with a full neurological examination, and subsequent Botox injection. A positive response to Botox has been an accurate predictor of a successful outcome. Single or multiple TSs may be treated. Migraine headaches can start in one area depending on their corresponding trigger site and spread to the rest of the head. It is important to identify the initial trigger sites rather than address all the areas of pain, after the inflammation involves the entire trigeminal tree.
Forehead migraine headaches: In the glabellar area the supra-orbital and supra-trochlear nerves are skeletonized by resecting the corrugator and depressor supercilii muscle using an endoscopic approach similar that of used for cosmetic forehead lift.
Temporal migraine headaches: The temporal area, where the zygomaticotemporal branch of trigeminal nerve passes through the temporalis muscle, is addressed using a similar endoscopic approach but involves removing a segment of the nerve rather than transecting the muscle. This results in a slight sensory defect over temporal skin area, but cross-innervation from other sensory nerves helps to limit the damage.
Occipital migraine headaches: The posterior neck area where the greater occipital nerve passes through the semispinalis capitis muscle is addressed with an open surgical approach with resection of a small segment of the semispinalis muscle and shielding the nerves with a subcutaneous adipose flap.

A further trigger point, not involving muscles, has been identified in the nose of patients who have significant nasal septum deviation with enlargement of the turbinates. The nasal trigger points where enlarged turbinates are in contact with the nasal septum are addressed with a septoplasty and a turbinectomy.

When is muscle surgery with trigger point release indicated?

Trigger point release is only carried out for patients who respond favorably to intramuscular injections of Botulinum toxin. This removes the guesswork, as the surgery is only carried out when a positive diagnosis has been made.

Patent foramen ovale closure

There is significant evidence that a link exists between migraine with aura and the presence of a patent foramen ovale (PFO), a hole between the upper chambers (the atria) of the heart. It is estimated that 20-25% of the general population in the United States has a PFO. Medical research studies have shown that migraineurs are twice as likely as the general population to have a PFO, that over 50% of sufferers of migraine with aura have a PFO, that patients with a PFO are 5.1 times more likely to suffer from migraines and 3.2 times more likely to have migraines with aura than the general population, and that patients with migraine with aura are much more likely to have a large opening than the general PFO population. There is however some controversy, as some have shown a link, while others have failed to demonstrate a link.

Details of the procedure

A catheter is advanced up to the hole in the heart after it is inserted in a vein in the leg. Through the catheter, a device is then placed which blocks the hole between the left and right atria of the heart. There are a number of different devices being used or tested, the Coherex FlatStent PFO Closure System, the CardioSEAL, and the AMPLATZER PFO Occluder device.

Migraine frequency and severity has been shown to be reduced if the hole (PFO) is patched surgically. It has been suggested that there is an advantage to non-pharmacological migraine relief - "in contrast to drugs, PFO closure appears highly effective against migraines and usually has no side effects". Because PFO closure continues to prove successful, new devices are being produced to make the surgery easier to perform and less invasive. Some studies, however, have emphasized caution in relating PFO closure surgeries to migraines, stating that the favorable studies have been poorly designed retrospective studies and that insufficient evidence exists to justify the dangerous procedure. There have however been reports of short-term increases in migraine frequency and intensity following the surgery.

Nerve stimulation

Occipital nerve stimulation (ONS)

Published reports from open-label studies have demonstrated possible efficacy of ONS in a variety of primary headache disorders, including chronic migraine. ONS for the treatment of medically intractable headaches was introduced by Weiner and Reed  ONS is typically performed with the equipment normally used for spinal cord stimulation (SCS), which includes electrodes and their leads, anchors to fasten the leads to connective tissue, and the implantable pulse generator (IPG).

Details of the procedure

Electrodes are placed subcutaneously (under the skin) superficial to the cervical muscle fascia, transverse to the affected occipital nerve trunk at the level of C1, usually using fluoroscopic guidance. The standard procedure is typically performed in two stages. The first stage, carried out under local anesthesia with sedation, is used to test the stimulation and determine optimal placement of electrodes. The second part, which involves insertion of the rest of the ONS system, is carried out under general anesthesia. However, a recent report of a small case series described successful placement of ONS systems entirely under general anesthesia while still achieving the desired occipital region stimulation.

When is ONS indicated?

A stimulation trial can be performed before the permanent implantation, with the view to improving selection of the candidates for a permanent stimulation. The procedure involves inserting percutaneous (through the skin) leads into the epidural space and externally powering them for 5–7 days. If the trial is successful in terms of significant pain improvement, the patient is offered a permanent implantation. However, in primary headache syndromes, unlike in neuropathic pain, there can be a considerable delay of several weeks to months before the response emerges and therefore the utility of a stimulation trial in selecting patients for permanent implantation remains questionable for now.

Procedures

Muscle relaxation

The involvement of the pericranial muscles in migraine has been well documented, and muscle relaxation techniques have been used successfully to prevent migraine.

Intra-oral appliances

Intra-oral appliance are designed to relax the pericranial muscles, which have been reported to be tender in 100% of migraine sufferers during an attack. There are a number of different designs, which have been reported to be effective in many migraine sufferers.

Biofeedback
Biofeedback is the process of gaining greater awareness of many physiological functions primarily using instruments that provide information on the activity of those same systems, with a goal of being able to manipulate them at will. Some of the processes that can be controlled include brainwaves, muscle tone, skin conductance, heart rate and pain perception. Biofeedback to induce muscle relaxation is widely used in migraine prevention.

Botulinum Toxin (Botox)
OnabotulinumtoxinA (trade name Botox) received FDA approval for treatment of chronic migraines (occurring more than 15 days per month) in 2010. The toxin is injected into the muscles of head and neck. Approval followed evidence presented to the agency from two studies funded by Allergan, Inc. showing an improvement in incidence of chronic migraines for migraine sufferers undergoing the Botox treatment. Since then, several randomized control trials have shown Botulinum Toxin Type A to improve headache symptoms and quality of life when used prophylactically for patients with chronic migraine

Medication
Preventive drugs are used to reduce the frequency, duration, and severity of migraine attacks. Because of frequent unpleasant and sometimes debilitating side effects, preventive drugs are only prescribed for those migraineurs whose quality of life is significantly adversely affected. The most commonly prescribed drugs for migraine prevention are beta-blockers, antidepressants, and anticonvulsants. The drugs are started at a low dose, which is gradually increased until therapeutic effects develop, the ceiling dose for the chosen drug is reached, or side effects become intolerable.

Beta-blockers
The beta-blocker propranalol's effectiveness in headache treatment was a chance finding in patients receiving the drug for angina (chest pain due to a lack of blood to the heart muscle). The beta-blockers that are used in migraine treatment are propranolol, nadolol, timolol, metoprolol, and atenolol.

Beta blockers adverse reactions
Adverse drug reactions (ADRs) associated with the use of beta blockers include: nausea, diarrhea, bronchospasm, dyspnea, cold extremities, exacerbation of Raynaud's syndrome, bradycardia, hypotension, heart failure, heart block, fatigue, dizziness, alopecia (hair loss), abnormal vision, hallucinations, insomnia, nightmares, sexual dysfunction, erectile dysfunction and/or alteration of glucose and lipid metabolism. Due to the high penetration across the blood–brain barrier, lipophilic beta blockers, such as propranolol and metoprolol, are more likely than other, less lipophilic, beta blockers to cause sleep disturbances, such as insomnia and vivid dreams and nightmares.

Antidepressants
Amitriptyline has been more frequently studied of the antidepressants and is the only antidepressant with fairly consistent support for efficacy in migraine prevention. The method of headache prevention with antidepressants is uncertain, but does not result from treating masked depression.

Amitriptyline adverse reactions
The main two side effects that occur from taking amitriptyline are drowsiness and a dry mouth. Other common side effects of using amitriptyline are mostly due to its anticholinergic activity, including: weight gain, changes in appetite, muscle stiffness, nausea, constipation, nervousness, dizziness, blurred vision, urinary retention, and changes in sexual function. Some rare side effects include seizures, tinnitus, hypotension, mania, psychosis, sleep paralysis, hypnagogic or hypnopompic hallucinations related to sleep paralysis, heart block, arrhythmias, lip and mouth ulcers, extrapyramidal symptoms, depression, tingling pain or numbness in the feet or hands, yellowing of the eyes or skin, pain or difficulty passing urine, confusion, abnormal production of milk in females, breast enlargement in both males and females, fever with increased sweating, and suicidal thoughts.

Anticonvulsants
Anticonvulsant medication is commonly prescribed for migraine prevention, because they have been shown in placebo-controlled double-blind trials to be effective in some migraine sufferers.

Valproate acid
Placebo controlled trials of both divalproex sodium and sodium valproate have shown them to be significantly better than placebo at reducing headache frequency.

Valproate adverse reactions
Nausea, vomiting, and gastrointestinal disturbances are the most common side-effects of valproate therapy, and are slightly less common with divalproex sodium than with sodium valproate. The results of a study on the long-term safety of divalproex sodium showed premature discontinuation of the drug in 36% of patients because of either drug intolerance or ineffectivity of the drug.

Topiramate
Topiramate has been approved by the FDA for prevention of migraine. Studies have shown that it provides significant reductions in the frequency of migraine episodes in patients with 3-12 headaches a month

Topiramate adverse reactions
Adverse reactions related to topiramate treatment occurred in 82.5% of 328 subjects who took part in an extensive trial covering 46 different centres. Most commonly reported were paresthesia (28.8%), upper respiratory tract infection (13.8%, and fatigue (11.9%)

Calcitonin gene-related peptide receptor antagonist 
Zavegepant was approved for medical use in the United States in March 2023.

Rescue treatment
The two main methods of rescue treatment are trigger avoidance and acute symptomatic control with medication. Medications are more effective if used earlier in an attack. A serious potential problem with the frequent use of medications is the possible development of medication overuse headache, in which the headaches become more severe and more frequent. This may occur with triptans, ergotamines, and analgesics, especially narcotic analgesics.

Ditans
Ditans are a class of abortive medication for the treatment of migraines.

Analgesics
Recommended initial treatment for those with mild to moderate symptoms are simple analgesics such as non-steroidal anti-inflammatory drugs (NSAIDs) or the combination of acetaminophen (paracetamol), acetylsalicylic acid, and caffeine. A number of NSAIDs have been shown to be effective. Ibuprofen provides effective pain relief in about 50%. Diclofenac has been found effective.

Non-steroidal anti-inflammatory drugs (NSAIDS)
A number of NSAIDs have evidence to support their use. Ibuprofen has been found to provide effective pain relief in about 50% of migraine attacks.

NSAIDS adverse reactions
The widespread use of NSAIDs has meant that the adverse effects of these drugs have become increasingly prevalent. The two main adverse drug reactions (ADRs) associated with NSAIDs relate to gastrointestinal (GI) effects and renal effects of the agents. These effects are dose-dependent, and in many cases severe enough to pose the risk of ulcer perforation, upper gastrointestinal bleeding, and death, limiting the use of NSAID therapy. An estimated 10-20% of NSAID patient’s experience dyspepsia, and NSAID-associated upper gastrointestinal adverse events are estimated to result in 103,000 hospitalizations and 16,500 deaths per year in the United States, and represent 43% of drug-related emergency visits. Many of these events are avoidable; a review of physician visits and prescriptions estimated that unnecessary prescriptions for NSAIDs were written in 42% of visits.

Acetylsalicylic acid
Acetylsalicylic acid (Aspirin) can relieve moderate to severe migraine pain, with an effectiveness similar to the triptans. Ketorolac is available in an intravenous formulation.

Acetylsalicylic acid adverse reactions
Aspirin should not be taken by people who have salicylate intolerance or a more generalized drug intolerance to NSAIDs, and caution should be exercised in those with asthma or NSAID-precipitated bronchospasm. Owing to its effect on the stomach lining, manufacturers recommend people with peptic ulcers, mild diabetes, or gastritis seek medical advice before using aspirin. Use of aspirin during dengue fever is not recommended owing to increased bleeding tendency. People with kidney disease, hyperuricemia, or gout should not take aspirin because it inhibits the kidneys' ability to excrete uric acid, and thus may exacerbate these conditions.

Acetaminophen (Paracetamol)
Paracetamol (also known as acetaminophen), either alone or in combination with metoclopramide (an anti-nausea drug), is another effective treatment with a low risk of adverse effects. In pregnancy acetaminophen and metoclopramide are deemed safe as are NSAIDs until the third trimester.

Acetaminophen (Paracetamol) adverse reactions
In recommended doses, the side effects of paracetamol are mild to non-existent. In contrast to aspirin, it is not a blood thinner (and thus may be used in patients where bleeding is a concern), and it does not cause gastric irritation. Compared to Ibuprofen—which can have adverse effects that include diarrhea, vomiting, and abdominal pain—paracetamol is well tolerated with fewer side effects. Prolonged daily use and may cause kidney or liver damage. Paracetamol is metabolized by the liver and is hepatotoxic; side effects may be more likely in chronic alcoholics or patients with liver damage.

Until 2010 paracetamol was believed safe in pregnancy however, in a study published in October 2010 it has been linked to infertility in the adult life of the unborn. Like NSAIDs and unlike opioid analgesics, paracetamol has not been found to cause euphoria or alter mood although recent research shows some evidence that paracetamol can ease psychological pain. Unlike aspirin, it is safe for children, as paracetamol is not associated with a risk of Reye's syndrome in children with viral illnesses. Chronic users of paracetamol may have a higher risk of developing blood cancer.

Triptans
Triptans such as sumatriptan are effective for both pain and nausea in up to 75% of migraineurs. They are the initially recommended treatments for those with moderate to severe pain or those with milder symptoms who do not respond to simple analgesics. The different forms available include oral, injectable, nasal spray, and oral dissolving tablets. In general, all the triptans appear equally effective, with similar side effects. However, individuals may respond better to specific ones.

Triptans - adverse reactions
Most side effects are mild, such as flushing; however, rare cases of myocardial ischemia have occurred. They are thus not recommended for people with cardiovascular disease. They are not addictive, but they are an exceedingly potent cause of medication overuse headaches if used more than 10 days per month.

Ergots
Ergotamine and dihydroergotamine (DHE) are older medications still prescribed for migraines, the latter in nasal spray and injectable forms. They appear equally effective to the triptans, are less expensive, and experience adverse effects that typically are benign. In the most debilitating cases, such as those with status migrainosus, they appear to be the most effective treatment option.

Ergots adverse reactions
The most common adverse effects are nausea, vomiting, abdominal pain, generalized weakness, tiredness, malaise, paresthesia, coldness, muscle pains, diarrhea, and chest tightness. These are less common with DHE than with ergotamine tartrate.

Phenothiazines

Phenothiazines, often used for the treatment of nausea and vomiting, are also effective for treating migraine headache. Prochlorperazine is typically used due to a more favorable treatment profile.

Other
Intravenous metoclopramide or intranasal lidocaine are other potential options. Metoclopramide is the recommended treatment for those who present to the emergency department. A single dose of intravenous dexamethasone, when added to standard treatment of a migraine attack, is associated with a 26% decrease in headache recurrence in the following 72 hours. Spinal manipulation for treating an ongoing migraine headache is not supported by evidence. It is recommended that opioids and barbiturates not be used.

References

Antimigraine drugs
Migraine